Typhoon Songda, known in the Philippines as Typhoon Nina, was the fourth-costliest typhoon on record. The 18th named storm of the 2004 Pacific typhoon season, Songda developed on August 26 near the Marshall Islands. Following a path that Typhoon Chaba took nine days prior, Songda moved west-northwestward and strengthened quickly amid favorable conditions.

Meteorological history

Forming in a similar region as Typhoon Chaba did nine days earlier, Typhoon Songda originated on August 26 from an area of convection, or thunderstorms, east-northeast of Kwajalein in the Marshall Islands. At 06:00 UTC that day, the Japan Meteorological Agency (JMA) assessed that a tropical depression developed. The convection steadily organized and consolidated into rainbands around a well-developed circulation, aided by low wind shear. At 11:30 UTC on August 28, the Joint Typhoon Warning Center issued a tropical cyclone formation alert, and just 30 minutes later upgraded the system to Tropical Depression 22W.

Favorable conditions allowed the nascent system to quickly intensify. At 00:00 UTC on August 28, the JMA upgraded the depression to a tropical storm, naming it Songda. Moving west-northwestward around the subtropical ridge to the north, the storm passed north of the Marshall Islands. An eye began becoming visible on satellite imagery on August 29, prompting the JTWC to upgrade Songda to typhoon status at 12:00 UTC that day. A day later, the JMA also upgraded the storm to typhoon status, and the agency estimated an initial peak intensity on August 31 of 165 km/h (105 mph). That day, the JTWC also estimated peak 1 minute winds of 230 km/h (145 mph), equivalent to a Category 4 on the Saffir-Simpson scale. Operationally, the JTWC estimated slightly higher winds and assessed Songda as a "super typhoon", but it was revised downward.

The typhoon increased in size as it approached the Northern Marianas Islands (CNMI), which was struck by Typhoon Chaba a week prior. On August 31, Songda turned more to the northwest, which spared the more populated islands of Saipan and Tinian. Subsequently, the typhoon turned more to the west-northwest and weakened slightly. However, an increase in northward outflow caused the convection to deepen, resulting in Songda re-intensifying. On September 4, the JTWC again estimated peak 1 minute winds of 230 km/h (145 mph), and the JMA assessed a peak 10 minute wind peak of 175 km/h (110 mph). Around that time, Songda had turned to the northwest and had developed a symmetric eyewall. At 08:00 UTC on September 5, the typhoon made landfall on the Japanese island of Okinawa while at peak intensity.

A break in the ridge steered Songda northward after the storm struck Okinawa. The storm gradually weakened, partly due to drier air, and accelerated northeastward on September 6 toward western Japan. At 00:00 UTC on September 7, Songda made landfall on Nagasaki in western Kyushu with 10 minute winds of 140 km/h (85 mph). Influenced by an approaching shortwave trough, the storm raced into the Sea of Japan and weakened to tropical storm status. Late on September 7, the JTWC issued their last advisory on Songda, noting that the storm was becoming extratropical. The JMA declared Songda as fully extratropical at 00:00 UTC the next day while the storm was just west of Hokkaido; at that time, the storm merged with a nearby non-tropical low and a cold front. After a brief turn to the north, the storm moved northeastward over northern Hokkaido and southern Sakhalin and entered the Sea of Okhotsk. On September 9, the remnants of Songda moved across the southern Kamchatka Peninsula before moving into the Bering Sea. Late on September 10, the JMA stopped tracking the storm after Songda crossed the 180th meridian. The storm continued eastward, entering the Gulf of Alaska on September 11. Two days later, the system moved inland after weakening further.

Impact
Early in its duration, Songda passed northeast of Enewetak Atoll in the Marshall Islands, producing gale-force sustained winds and typhoon-force gusts.

Ahead of the storm's passage, a typhoon watch was issued for Agrihan. Moving through the CNMI as a powerful typhoon, Songda largely spared the more populated islands in the south. Typhoon-force winds also affected Agrihan and Alamagan. In the northern islands of the CNMI, Songda destroyed all of the homes while defoliating the coconut and breadfruit trees. Damage was estimated at $500,000 (USD).

On September 3, the storm came close enough to the Philippines to warrant monitoring from PAGASA, which named the storm Nina. Monsoon-induced rainfall from Songda, in conjunction with Typhoon Aere in the South China Sea, caused flooding in portions of the Philippines. This led to landslides and traffic accidents, as well as eight deaths.

On the mainland, Pohang recorded  of rainfall over 24 hours. Damage in the country was estimated at $250 million (USD).

Japan

Typhoon Songda was the seventh of ten typhoons to strike the Japanese mainland during 2004, the most typhoon landfalls since the JMA began keeping records in 1951. Its track across Kyushu into the Sea of Japan brought the strongest winds to most of Japan, peaking at 144 km/h (89 mph) in Seto, Ehime on western Shikoku. While the storm was near Okinawa, it produced a 1200 km (745 mi) plume of moisture that spread northward across Japan. In some places, the rains were enhanced by mountains, a process known as orographic lift. Significant rainfall totals occurred in short periods of time, including  in Soeda, Fukuoka. The heaviest damage was on Kyushu and western Honshu. The high winds damaged many roofs, including that of newer public buildings, which accounted for a large portion of the damage. Flooding affected 8,360 houses, and 42,183 homes sustained damage during the storm, of which 109 were completely destroyed. In addition to housing damage, Songda wrecked  of crop fields and damaged 1,592 ships. Overall, the typhoon killed 47 people in Japan and injured another 1,364, 205 of them severely. Damage nationwide were about JP¥126.2 billion (US$1.15 billion) .

The typhoon first passed near Okinawa Prefecture. Minamidaitōjima to the east of Okinawa registered a peak wind gust of 190 km/h (118 mph). High waves flooded six houses and inundated several roads, and one roof was damaged. Across the prefecture, 152 people evacuated, while air and sea travel was halted. The storm injured 16 people, one seriously, and left JP¥880 million (US$8 million) in damage, mostly sugar cane losses.

In Nagasaki, the winds damaged the roof of a high school. A factory was damaged in Ōmuta, Fukuoka.

Along western Honshu, Songda damaged the Yamaguchi Center for Arts and Media and the Kirara Genki Dome in Yamaguchi Prefecture. Winds and strong waves heavily damaged the Itsukushima Shrine, a structure over water in Hiroshima that dates back to the 14th century.

The storm restrengthened while over the Sea of Japan, causing additional heavy damage by the time it reached Hokkaido. High wind gusts knocked down trees and sign posts. There, about 0.1% of the houses were damaged. High winds damaged the roof of a high school in Ebetsu.

Aftermath
The high damage across Japan caused insurance companies to pay $4 billion (USD) to policy holders.

See also

Typhoon Mireille – second costliest Pacific typhoon on record, also struck Japan in 1991

Notes

References

2004 Pacific typhoon season
Songda
2004 in Japan